Johannes Paalberg (25 January 1883 Liigvalla Parish, Järva County - 10 October 1949 Väinjärve Parish, Järva County) was an Estonian politician. He was a member of Estonian Constituent Assembly. On 11 May 1919, he resigned his position and he was replaced by Julius Reintam.

References

1883 births
1949 deaths
Members of the Estonian Constituent Assembly